Trachyrhamphus serratus, also known as the crested pipefish or saw pipefish, is a species of marine fish belonging to the family Syngnathidae. They can be found in Sargassum beds, mud, and sandy habitats from Southern India to South Korea and Japan. This species is observed at depths ranging from 15 to 100 meters.

References

External links 
 Trachyrhamphus serratus at FishBase

Syngnathidae
Fish described in 1850
Taxa named by Coenraad Jacob Temminck
Taxa named by A. Allen Alexander